The Claiborne Formation or Claiborne Group is a geologic formation in Arkansas, Illinois, Kentucky, and Texas. It preserves fossils dating back to the Paleogene period .

See also

 List of fossiliferous stratigraphic units in Kentucky

References

 

Paleogene Arkansas
Paleogene Kentucky
Paleogene geology of Texas